The Baptist Churches in Vietnam is a Baptist Christian denomination in Vietnam. It is affiliated with the Baptist World Alliance. The headquarters is in Ho Chi Minh City.

History
The Baptist Churches in Vietnam has its origins in an American mission of the International Mission Board in 1959, in Ho Chi Minh City.   It is officially founded in 1989.  According to a denomination census released in 2020, it claimed 509 churches and 40,000 members.

See also 
 Bible
 Born again
 Worship service (evangelicalism)
 Jesus Christ
 Believers' Church

References

External links
 Official Website

Baptist denominations in Asia
Evangelicalism in Vietnam